Robert Wardell Clark (May 10, 1891 - July 28, 1955) was a professional baseball infielder in the Negro leagues. He played with the St. Louis Giants and the Pittsburgh Keystones in 1921.

References

External links
 and Baseball-Reference Black Baseball stats and Seamheads

Pittsburgh Keystones players
St. Louis Giants players
1891 births
1955 deaths
Baseball second basemen
Baseball shortstops
Baseball players from Kansas
20th-century African-American sportspeople